"Ain't Got No Home" may refer to:

 "Ain't Got No Home" (Clarence "Frogman" Henry song)
 "Ain't Got No Home" (Woody Guthrie song)